The Mt. Moriah Masonic Temple is a historic building in Kadoka, South Dakota.  It was constructed in 1917, as a meeting hall for Mt. Moriah Lodge No. 155 (a local area Masonic lodge). The building was listed on the National Register of Historic Places in 2004 as Mt. Moriah Masonic Lodge No. 155.  It has also been known as the  Kadoka Masonic Hall.

It has a two-story pedimented portico with Doric columns and pilasters.

References

Neoclassical architecture in South Dakota
Masonic buildings completed in 1917
Buildings and structures in Jackson County, South Dakota
Masonic buildings in South Dakota
Clubhouses on the National Register of Historic Places in South Dakota
National Register of Historic Places in Jackson County, South Dakota
1917 establishments in South Dakota